Akio Chen (born 29 September 1956) is a Taiwanese actor. He won the Golden Bell Award for Best Actor in a Miniseries or Television Film in 2006.

He played the role of Lih in the 2004 film Come the Black Dog directed by Stan Yin. In 2009, Chen appeared in The Sight of Father’s Back, a segment of Chang Tso-chi's anthology film How Are You, Dad. In The Boar King (2014), directed by Kuo Chen-ti, Chen's character dies during Typhoon Morakot. Prior to taking a leading role on the 2017 television drama The Teenage Psychic, Chen had appeared in several supporting roles on television.

References

External links

1956 births
Living people
Taiwanese male television actors
Taiwanese male film actors
21st-century Taiwanese male actors
Taipei National University of the Arts alumni